Boreotrophon clavatus is a species of sea snail, a marine gastropod mollusk in the family Muricidae.

Description

Distribution

References

Gastropods described in 1878
Boreotrophon